Michael William Gordon (September 11, 1953 – May 26, 2014) was a catcher in  Major League Baseball who played from  to  for the Chicago Cubs. Listed at 6' 3", 215 lb., he was a switch hitter and threw right handed.

Gordon died of acute myeloid leukemia at Brigham and Women's Hospital in Boston, Massachusetts on May 26, 2014.

Sources

External links

1953 births
2014 deaths
Baseball players from Massachusetts
Cardenales de Lara players
American expatriate baseball players in Venezuela
Chicago Cubs players
Deaths from cancer in Massachusetts
Deaths from acute myeloid leukemia
Gulf Coast Cubs players
Key West Conchs players
Key West Cubs players
Major League Baseball catchers
Midland Cubs players
People from Leominster, Massachusetts
Sportspeople from Worcester County, Massachusetts
Quincy Cubs players
Wichita Aeros players